The 18th Cinemalaya Independent Film Festival was held from August 5–14, 2022 in Metro Manila, Philippines. A total of eleven full-length features and twelve short films competed. The festival was opened by the film Leonor Will Never Die by Martika Ramirez Escobar and its closing film was Delikado by Karl Malakunas and We Don't Dance for Nothing by Stefanos Tai. This year marks the return of the full-length category as well as the festival's return to on-site screening since the breakout of the COVID-19 pandemic.

Entries
The winning film is highlighted with boldface and a dagger.

Full-Length Features

Short films

Awards
The awards ceremony was held on August 14, 2022, at the Tanghalang Nicanor Abelardo (CCP Main Theater), Cultural Center of the Philippines. In the full-length category, Blue Room won the most awards with five, followed by The Baseball Player with four.

Full-Length Features
 Best Film – The Baseball Player by Carlo Obispo
 Special Jury Prize – Blue Room by Ma-an L. Asuncion Dagñalan
 Audience Choice Award – Kargo by TM Malones
 Best Direction – Blue Room by Ma-an L. Asuncion Dagñalan
 Best Actor – Tommy Alejandrino for The Baseball Player
 Best Actress – Max Eigenmann for 12 Weeks
 Best Supporting Actor –  Soliman Cruz for Blue Room
 Best Supporting Actress – Ruby Ruiz for Ginhawa
 Best Screenplay – Carlo Obispo for The Baseball Player
 Best Cinematography – Neil Daza for Blue Room
 Best Editing – Zig Dulay for The Baseball Player
 Best Sound Design – Pepe Manikan for Bula Sa Langit
 Best Original Music Score – Isha Abubakar for Retirada
 Best Production Design – Marxie Maolen Fadul for Blue Room

Short films
 Best Film – "Black Rainbow" by Zig Dulay
 Special Jury Prize – "Dikit" by Gabriela Serrano
 Audience Choice Award – "Mga Handum Nga Nasulat Sa Baras" by Arlie Sweet Sumagaysay and Richard Jeroui Salvadico
 Best Screenplay – "Black Rainbow" by Zig Dulay
 Best Direction – Gabriela Serrano for "Dikit"

References

External links
Cinemalaya Independent Film Festival

Cinemalaya Independent Film Festival
Cine
Cine
2022 in Philippine cinema